Samson Ndicka-Matam (born 22 April 1976) is a retired male weightlifter from Cameroon, who later represented France. He competed in three consecutive Summer Olympics, starting in 1996 for Cameroon (Atlanta, Georgia). His best finish was the sixth place in the men's featherweight division (2004).

Personal
Three of his brothers are also international weightlifters who competed at the Olympic Games. That are Alphonse Hercule Matam (1992), David Matam (2004) and Bernardin Matam (2012).

References

External links
 

1976 births
Living people
French male weightlifters
Cameroonian male weightlifters
Weightlifters at the 1996 Summer Olympics
Weightlifters at the 2000 Summer Olympics
Weightlifters at the 2004 Summer Olympics
Olympic weightlifters of France
Olympic weightlifters of Cameroon
Cameroonian emigrants to France
Naturalized citizens of France
Mediterranean Games silver medalists for France
Mediterranean Games bronze medalists for France
Mediterranean Games medalists in weightlifting
Competitors at the 2005 Mediterranean Games